Chellappah Coomaraswamy (born 25 August 1887) was a Ceylon Tamil civil servant, diplomat and member of the Senate of Ceylon.

Early life and family
Coomaraswamy was born on 25 August 1887. He was the son of Chellappah from Aiyanarkoviladi. Coomaraswamy was educated at Jaffna Hindu College and Royal College, Colombo.

Coomaraswamy married Mankayatkarasi, daughter of Mudaliyar Sabapathy and Manicka Ammaiyar from Nallur. They had three sons (Rajendra, Mahendra and Satyendra) and one daughter (Sundareswari).

Career
Coomaraswamy joined the Government Clerical Service after finishing his education. He was appointed to the civil service in 1910. He was Police Magistrate in Puttalam in 1913, District Judge and Registrar General. He served as District Judge in Jaffna in 1933 before becoming Government Agent for the Northern Province.

Later life
After retirement Coomaraswamy was nominated to the Senate of Ceylon in 1947. He served as the Ceylonese High Commissioner in New Delhi between 1950 and 1955.

References

1887 births
Alumni of Jaffna Hindu College
Alumni of Royal College, Colombo
Government Agents (Sri Lanka)
High Commissioners of Sri Lanka to India
Members of the Senate of Ceylon
People from Northern Province, Sri Lanka
People from British Ceylon
Sri Lankan Tamil civil servants
Sri Lankan diplomats
Tamil people
Sri Lankan Tamil politicians
Year of death missing